Ali Al-Salem Al-Sabah Stadium is a multi-use stadium in Al Farwaniyah, Kuwait.  It is currently used mostly for football matches, on club level by Al Naser Sporting Club of the Kuwaiti Premier League. The stadium has a capacity of 10,000 spectators.

International Soccer Matches

References

Football venues in Kuwait